The 1967 season was the Hawthorn Football Club's 43rd season in the Victorian Football League and 66th overall.

Schedule

Premiership season

Ladder

References

Hawthorn Football Club seasons